A hoodlum is a thug, usually in a group of misfits who are associated with crime or theft.

Hoodlum may also refer to:

The Hoodlum (1919 film), starring Mary Pickford
The Hoodlum (1951 film), an American film directed by Max Nosseck
Hoodlum (film), a 1997 film starring Laurence Fishburne
Hoodlum (soundtrack)
"Hoodlum" (song), a 1997 song by Mobb Deep
NATO codename for the Russian/Soviet Kamov Ka-26 utility helicopter
Enemies in the video game Rayman 3: Hoodlum Havoc